Semapa - Sociedade de Investimento e Gestão is a Portuguese conglomerate holding company with interests in the cement, pulp and paper and environmental services sectors.

The company owns 76.7% of The Navigator Company, previously known as Portucel Soporcel, Europe's largest producer of bleached eucalyptus kraft pulp. It also holds 51% of Secil Group, a manufacturer of cement and its derivatives; and 100% of ETSA, a waste management firm involved in the collection, storage and treatment of animal by-products.

The company is listed on Euronext Lisbon stock exchange and is a constituent of the PSI 20 index.

References

External links

Conglomerate companies of Portugal
Companies based in Lisbon
Conglomerate companies established in 1991
Pulp and paper companies of Portugal
Cement companies of Portugal